"Smotri – eto kino..." (meaning "Watch – It's a Movie..." in Russian) is the last known recording by the Russian-Korean (Koryo-saram) musician Viktor Tsoi. The title is a pun with the name of Tsoi's band Kino.

History 
The song was written and recorded by Tsoi sometime in 1990. The song, however, was not fully recorded, according to the liner notes of the album which state: "Unfortunately, the final track was never fully recorded". It consists of Tsoi and Tsoi alone on vocals and acoustic guitar.

The fragment was remastered and released on the compilation Poslednie zapisi in 2002.

External links 
 Poslednie zapisi at Discogs

2002 songs
Kino (band) songs